Song Xilian (宋希濂; April 9, 1907－February 13, 1993) styled as Yin Guo, was born in Xikou, Xiangxiang County, Hunan Province. He graduated from the first class of the Huangpu Military Academy and was known as the "light of Huangpu." He was a major general in the Republic of China's army, an important leader in Chiang Kai-shek's regime, and a famous anti-Japanese general. He graduated from the Central Army Officers School's first infantry class, the China Officer Class at Japan's Chiba Army Infantry School, the first class of the Army War College's General Staff Course, and the first class of the Army War College's Superior Officer Course.

He served as the commander of the newly formed 36th Division of the Central Army, the commander of the 78th Army, the honorary commander of the First Division, the commander of the 71st Army of the National Revolutionary Army, the deputy commander-in-chief of the 34th Group Army and the commander of the 71st Army, the commander-in-chief of the 11th Group Army and the commander of the Kunming Defense Command, the head of the 9th branch of the Central Military Academy, the chief of staff of the Northwest Expeditionary Force, the commander-in-chief of the Xinjiang Provincial Security Command (while still serving as head of the 9th branch), the acting head of the Northwest Expeditionary Force, the deputy commander-in-chief of the Huazhong Anti-Japanese United Army and commander of the 14th Army Corps, the commander-in-chief of the Xiang-E Border Area Pacification Headquarters and commander of the 14th Training Command, the deputy chief of staff of the Huazhong Military Government and the commander of the Xiang-E Border Area Pacification Headquarters, the head of the Sichuan-Hunan-Hubei-Chongqing Border Area Pacification Office (in charge of the military and political power of the three provinces), and the director of the Sichuan-Hunan-Hubei-Guizhou Border Area's "Highest Decision-Making Committee."

He was captured in the Second Sino-Civil War's Southwest Campaign in November 1949. In 1959, he was released and pardoned as one of the first batch of war criminals, and served as a standing committee member of the National Committee of the Chinese People's Political Consultative Conference, a member of the National Committee for the Compilation of Historical and Cultural Materials, a member of the Fourth National Committee of the Chinese People's Political Consultative Conference, and a standing committee member of the Fifth, Sixth, and Seventh National Committees of the Chinese People's Political Consultative Conference. He was also the general adviser of the China Association for the Promotion of Peaceful Reunification, the vice chairman of the Huangpu Military Academy Alumni Association (which jointly elected Marshal Xu Xiangqian as its first chairman), and a member of the National Committee of the Chinese People's Political Consultative Conference's Committee for Liaison with Compatriots in Taiwan, Hong Kong, Macao, and Overseas Chinese."

Early life 
In 1920, Song Xilian tested into Changjun High School in Changsha, Hunan Province.  In January 1924, he left his family and, with Chen Geng from the same county, traveled to Guangzhou where they enlisted in Huangpu Military Academy's first class, and Song Xilian would be that class's youngest graduate.  He Joined the Kuomintang in June of that year, and in 1925 he would take part in the National Revolutionary Army's first Eastern Punitive Expedition.  After the expedition he was promoted to vice commander of the 4th company and by early June was company Commander.

In 1927 he left for Chiba, Japan to study at the local military academy.

Return to China 
In 1930, following the breakout of the Central Plains War, Song Xilian returned to China, becoming a staff officer in the National Revolutionary Army's 1st division.  He held the rank of lieutenant colonel.  In 1931 the division was reformed into the 87th division, and Song Xilian led the 261st brigade.  In 1932 he took part in the January 28 Incident.

Later life 
In the Chinese Revolutionary War, he was captured by the Communists and jailed in Beijing's Gongdelin Prison. In 1959 he was exonerated, released and given position in government. He left China for the US in 1980 where he died in 1993.

National Revolutionary Army generals from Hunan
People from Xiangtan
Chinese military writers
American writers of Chinese descent
Writers from Hunan
1907 births
1993 deaths